Stone Horizons is a 1956 Argentine film directed by Román Viñoly Barreto. The movie addresses the position of the native population.

Cast
  Mario Lozano
  Milagros de la Vega
  Julia Sandoval
  Atahualpa Yupanqui
  Liana Noda
  Enrique Fava
  Félix Rivero
  Enrique Abela		
  Fausto Etchegoin		
  Roberto Rivas		
  Félix Rivero

References

External links
 

1956 films
1950s Spanish-language films
Argentine black-and-white films
Indigenous cinema in Latin America
Films directed by Román Viñoly Barreto
1950s Argentine films
Argentine drama films
1956 drama films